The New Jersey Turnpike (NJTP) is a system of controlled-access highways in the U.S. state of New Jersey. The turnpike is maintained by the New Jersey Turnpike Authority (NJTA). Its original northern terminus was at an interchange with I-80 and US 46 in Ridgefield Park in Bergen County; the turnpike was later extended to the George Washington Bridge and New York City. Construction of the mainline from concept to completion took 22 months, from 1950 to 1951. It was opened to traffic on November 5, 1951, between its southern terminus and exit 10.

The turnpike is a major thoroughfare providing access to various localities in New Jersey. The toll road provides a direct bypass southeast of Philadelphia for long-distance travelers between New York City and Washington, D.C. According to the International Bridge, Tunnel and Turnpike Association, the turnpike is the nation's sixth-busiest toll road and one of the most heavily traveled highways in the nation.

The northern part of the mainline turnpike, along with the entirety of its extensions and spurs, is part of the Interstate Highway System, designated as I-95 between exit 6 in Mansfield Township and its northern end. South of exit 6, it has the unsigned Route 700 designation. There are three extensions and two spurs, including the Newark Bay Extension at exit 14, which carries I-78; the Pennsylvania Turnpike Extension, officially known as the Pearl Harbor Memorial Turnpike Extension, at exit 6 which carries I-95 off the mainline turnpike; the Eastern Spur and the Western Spur which split traffic between Newark and Ridgefield; and the I-95 Extension which continues the mainline to the George Washington Bridge in Fort Lee. All segments except for the I-95 Extension are tolled.

The route is divided into four roadways between exit 6 and exit 14. The inner lanes are normally restricted to carrying only cars, with the outer lanes for cars, trucks, and buses. The turnpike has  lanes,  shoulders and 13 rest areas named after notable New Jersey residents. The Interstate Highway System took some of its design guidelines from those for the turnpike. The turnpike has been referenced in music, film, and television.

Route description 

The mainline of the New Jersey Turnpike splits from I-295 in Carneys Point Township and runs along a north-northeast route to Fort Lee just before the George Washington Bridge, where the road continues as I-95 in New York City; the original northern end was at I-80 in Teaneck. It is designated Route 700, an unsigned route, from exit 1 (Delaware Memorial Bridge) to exit 6, and as I-95 from exit 6 (Mansfield Township) to exit 18 (Secaucus–Carlstadt). The number of lanes ranges from four lanes south of exit 4 (Mount Laurel Township), six lanes between exit 4 and exit 6 (Mansfield Township), 12 lanes between exit 6 and exit 11 (Woodbridge Township), and 14 lanes between exit 11 and exit 14 (Newark). The Newark Bay Extension carries a  limit. The turnpike has variable speed limit signs allowing for the limit to be lowered temporarily during unusual road conditions.

Before the advent of the Interstate Highway System, the entire Turnpike was designated by the New Jersey Department of Transportation (NJDOT) as Route 700. The Pearl Harbor Memorial Turnpike Extension was Route 700P, and the Newark Bay Extension was Route 700N. None of these state highway designations have been signed. The entire length of the New Jersey Turnpike is part of the National Highway System, a network of roads important to the country's economy, defense, and mobility.

Pennsville to Springfield Township 

The turnpike's southern terminus lies at the approach to the Delaware Memorial Bridge in Carneys Point and Pennsville townships, with a series of closely-spaced interchanges that provide access to Route 49, US 130, northbound I-295, eastbound US 40, Route 140 and County Route 540 (CR 540) along with several local roads.  Through this section, the turnpike has three northbound lanes and two southbound lanes. The Route 49 and US 130 exits are labeled 1A and 1B respectively, while the other exits are unnumbered.  The turnpike loses its third northbound lane, and continues on with two lanes in each direction and a  speed limit. After crossing over Game Creek, the turnpike reaches the exit 1 toll plaza, where northbound drivers must obtain a ticket, and southbound drivers must surrender their ticket and pay the proper toll. Two Express E-ZPass lanes are provided in each direction. Paralleling I-295, the turnpike continues north/northeast through rural Salem County with two lanes in each direction. After passing under Route 48, the turnpike enters Oldmans Township, where it has the John Fenwick Service Area northbound and the Clara Barton Service Area southbound. The turnpike then briefly enters Pilesgrove Township before crossing the Oldmans Creek into Woolwich Township.

Continuing northeast, the turnpike crosses the SMS Rail Lines' Salem Branch before passing to the south of Swedesboro. After crossing the Raccoon Creek, the highway reaches an interchange for US 322. A maintenance yard is present on the northbound side of the turnpike immediately north of the interchange into Harrison Township. The route heads northeast into East Greenwich Township past farmland before crossing Edwards Creek. Here, the turnpike passes by residential developments and soon crosses the Mantua Creek into West Deptford Township, where it passes through parkland before development near the route increases substantially. After passing under Route 45, the turnpike enters Woodbury Heights, where it passes by homes before crossing Conrail Shared Assets Operations' (CSAO) Vineland Secondary and entering Deptford Township. Here, the turnpike passes under Route 47 before crossing the Big Timber Creek. Immediately northeast of this point, the turnpike passes under the Route 42 freeway and enters the Camden County borough of Bellmawr. After passing to the south of an industrial park, the turnpike enters Runnemede and comes to an exit for Route 168 (Black Horse Pike), serving the city of Camden to the north and providing access to the Atlantic City Expressway to the south. Immediately after the interchange, the turnpike crosses back into Bellmawr before entering Barrington, where it passes under Route 41. The turnpike then passes near packaging plants before entering Lawnside and crossing US 30.

Still two lanes in each direction, the turnpike continues northeast past a warehouse and eventually comes within yards of I-295. Upon entering Cherry Hill, the turnpike passes over tracks carrying the PATCO Speedline and NJ Transit's Atlantic City Line before reaching the Walt Whitman Service Area along the southbound lanes. Continuing northeast, the turnpike passes under Route 70 before crossing the Pennsauken Creek into Mount Laurel, Burlington County, where it has an exit for Route 73. North of this point, the turnpike has three lanes in each direction. Still running within close proximity of I-295, the turnpike comes to a New Jersey State Police station and passes under Route 38 before crossing CSAO's Pemberton Industrial Track. After the northbound James Fenimore Cooper Service Area, the road crosses over Rancocas Creek and passes to the northwest of Rancocas State Park. Now in Westampton Township, the distance between I-295 and the turnpike increases, and the turnpike reaches an exit for CR 541 (Burlington-Mount Holly Road). Northeast of this point, the turnpike continues as a six-lane highway into Burlington Township, where it passes by houses and the Burlington Country Club before entering Springfield Township. Here, the turnpike passes by agricultural areas before crossing Assiscunk Creek.

Mansfield Township to Newark

Now in Mansfield Township, the turnpike splits into a "dual-dual" configuration similar to a local-express configuration. The outer lanes are open to all vehicles and the inner lanes are limited to cars only, unless signed otherwise because of unusual conditions. The turnpike has now has a total of 12 lanes, six in each direction (3-3-3-3). Just north of the split is an interchange with the Pearl Harbor Memorial Turnpike Extension, where the turnpike mainline becomes concurrent with I-95. North of this point, the turnpike enters Bordentown Township and has an exit for US 206. Continuing northeast, the turnpike passes by a mix of residential neighborhoods and farmland and enters Chesterfield Township before passing over Crosswicks Creek and entering Hamilton Township in Mercer County. The highway then reaches the Woodrow Wilson and Richard Stockton service areas on the southbound and northbound sides, respectively. After the service areas, the turnpike enters Robbinsville Township and reaches an exit for I-195, an east–west freeway connecting the state capital of Trenton with the Jersey Shore. North of I-195, the turnpike passes to the west of several warehouses and traverses numerous parks and wooded areas. After crossing Assunpink Creek, the turnpike enters East Windsor Township, where the road changes its course to a slightly more northerly path. Near Hightstown is an exit for Route 133, which connects the turnpike with and provides a bypass for Route 33 in the area. North of here, the turnpike crosses the Millstone River into Cranbury Township, Middlesex County and passes more warehouses on both sides of the road in addition to the southbound Molly Pitcher Service Area. After entering Monroe Township, the turnpike has a modified trumpet interchange with Route 32 serving Jamesburg. The interchange has a ramp for traffic seeking Route 32 eastbound forming an "S" shape, taking traffic to Cranbury South River Road. Upon crossing into South Brunswick, the turnpike crosses CSAO's Amboy Secondary and passes by more industrial parks. The highway then enters East Brunswick, where suburban development along the corridor greatly increases, indicating the entrance to the built-up portion of the New York metropolitan area. Continuing north, the turnpike passes to the east of a golf course and has the northbound Joyce Kilmer Service Area. The route briefly enters Milltown before crossing back into East Brunswick, where it passes by many homes before reaching an exit for Route 18 serving the county seat of New Brunswick. After Route 18, the turnpike enters New Brunswick and crosses over the Raritan River on the Basilone Memorial Bridge into Edison. The structure honors John Basilone, a Raritan resident who is the only United States Marine to be honored with the Medal of Honor, the Navy Cross and the Purple Heart. He died in the Battle of Iwo Jima in 1945.

After crossing the Rartian River, the turnpike passes by several warehouses and industrial parks before crossing CSAO's Bonhamtown Industrial Track line and reaching an exit serving I-287 and Route 440. Soon afterwards, the turnpike passes over the Middlesex Greenway and enters Woodbridge Township, where it reaches an exit serving the Garden State Parkway and US 9. North of this interchange is the headquarters of the New Jersey Turnpike Authority. From Woodbridge Township to Newark, high-occupancy vehicle lanes (HOV lanes) exist on the outer roadway (truck lanes), thereby making it seven lanes in each direction (4-3-3-4). The HOV restrictions are in effect on weekdays, from 6:00 a.m. to 9:00 a.m. northbound, and 4:00 p.m. to 7:00 p.m. southbound (at times, the NJTA might suspend the HOV restrictions entirely during peak hours in case of unusual conditions). Continuing northeast, the turnpike passes under Route 35 and crosses NJ Transit's North Jersey Coast Line. Past this point, the turnpike crosses the Woodbridge River and reaches the Grover Cleveland Service Area northbound and the Thomas Edison Service Area southbound. After passing over CSAO's Port Reading Secondary line, the turnpike enters Carteret and begins to run parallel to CSAO's Chemical Coast Secondary line, which is located east of the turnpike. In Carteret, the highway comes to an interchange serving the borough in addition to Rahway. Immediately north of the interchange, the Wallberg-Lovely Memorial Bridge carries the turnpike over the Rahway River. The bridge is dedicated to Private Martin Wallberg from Westfield, and Private Luke Lovely from, South Amboy, the first soldiers from New Jersey to die in World War I.  In Linden, the turnpike passes to the east of a large industrial park before reaching an exit for I-278, which traverses the nearby Goethals Bridge. After bisecting residential areas, the route comes to an exit for Route 81, providing access to Newark Liberty International Airport. While passing to the east of the airport, the turnpike passes to the west of the Elizabeth Center big-box center and the Port Newark–Elizabeth Marine Terminal upon entering Newark. A section of the turnpike and the surrounding land in Elizabeth and Newark has been called "the most dangerous two miles in America" by New Jersey Homeland Security officials due to the high volume of traffic and the density of potential terrorist targets in the surrounding area.

Newark to Ridgefield Park 
 After reaching the north end of the airport, the HOV lanes end, and the turnpike reaches a junction with I-78, which is also the Newark Bay Extension of the turnpike east of the mainline. North of I-78, the turnpike passes over CSAO's Chemical Coast Secondary, Greenville Running Track, and National Docks Branch at the Oak Island Yard. At this point, the car-truck lane configuration ends, and the turnpike splits into two spurs: the Eastern Spur (the original roadway) and the Western Spur (opened in 1970). Both are signed as I-95. The Western Spur is posted for through traffic on I-95 seeking I-280 and the George Washington Bridge, while traffic seeking US 46, I-80, and the Lincoln Tunnel is routed via the Eastern Spur. NJDOT, which calls every class of highway "Route", calls the Western Spur "Route 95W". The NJTA refers to the complex series of roadways and ramps linking the car–truck lanes, the two spurs, as well as traffic heading to and from I-78 as the "Southern Mixing Bowl".  Both spurs have an exit for US 1/9 Truck and pass under the Pulaski Skyway (US 1/9) at this point before crossing over CSAO's Passaic and Harsimus Line, and will meet up at US 46 and I-80 to continue to the George Washington Bridge where the Turnpike will eventually end.

Eastern Spur

The Eastern Spur crosses the Passaic River on the Chaplain Washington Bridge, which honors Rev. John P. Washington who gave up his life jacket and died as the SS Dorchester sank on February 3, 1943. After crossing over tracks carrying PATH's Newark–World Trade Center line, NJ Transit's Morris & Essex Lines, and Amtrak's Northeast Corridor, the spur surfaces into Kearny, Hudson County, as a six-lane highway, and has a partial junction with I-280, containing only a southbound exit and northbound entrance. Past this point, the spur passes over Route 7 and crosses the Hackensack River on the Lewandowski Hackensack River Bridge. The bridge was named in honor of the three Lewandowski brothers, Army Private Alexander, Marine Sergeant Walter and Air Force Lieutenant William, who were killed in action during World War II within 18 months of each other. The turnpike then enters Secaucus and crosses Norfolk Southern's Boonton Line before passing over NJ Transit's Main Line just north of the Secaucus Junction station serving NJ Transit trains running along the Northeast Corridor and the Main Line. After the southbound lanes have the Alexander Hamilton Service Area, the turnpike reaches the exit 16E/18E toll plaza, serving as the northern end of the ticket system. Immediately afterwards is an interchange with Route 495 and Route 3, providing access to the Lincoln Tunnel. After passing through swampland in the New Jersey Meadowlands, the spur crosses into Ridgefield, Bergen County. Here, the Eastern Spur comes to the northernmost service area on the turnpike, the Vince Lombardi Service Area. After passing over the New York, Susquehanna and Western Railway's New Jersey Subdivision line and CSX's River Subdivision line, the highway merges back together with the Western Spur as it passes east of PSE&G's Bergen Generating Station and crosses Overpeck Creek into Ridgefield Park, where the turnpike comes to its original northern terminus at US 46.

Western Spur
The Harry Laderman Bridge, named after the first turnpike employee killed on the job, carries the Western Spur over the Passaic River and then tracks carrying PATH's Newark–World Trade Center line, NJ Transit's Morris & Essex Lines, and Amtrak's Northeast Corridor. Running north with six lanes, the Western Spur has a full interchange with I-280 before crossing over Route 7 and the Boonton Line. The spur then enters Lyndhurst and crosses NJ Transit's Main Line and Berrys Creek before passing over NJ Transit's Bergen County Line and entering East Rutherford. Here, the Western Spur has a junction with Route 3, where it loses a lane in each direction. The highway reaches the exit 18W toll plaza before passing by the Meadowlands Sports Complex and the American Dream shopping and entertainment complex, which are served by a southbound exit and northbound entrance with connections to Route 120 and CR 503 via Route 3. After crossing the Hackensack River, the Western Spur has access to the Vince Lombardi Service Area before crossing the River Subdivision line and merging with the Eastern Spur.

Extensions 

It connects Newark with Lower Manhattan via the Holland Tunnel in Jersey City and intersects the mainline near Newark Liberty International Airport. This extension has three exits (exits 14A, 14B, and 14C), and due to its design (four lanes with a shoulderless Jersey barrier divider), has a  speed limit. The extension traverses the Newark Bay Bridge (officially the Vincent R. Casciano Memorial Bridge), which is a steel cantilever bridge spanning Newark Bay and connecting Newark and Bayonne. Dubbed the "world's most expensive road" by The Jersey Journal, it was completed April 4, 1956, as part of the turnpike's Newark Bay Extension. Casciano was a state assemblyman and a lifetime resident of Bayonne.

The second extension, known as the Pearl Harbor Memorial Turnpike Extension (or Pennsylvania Turnpike Connector), carries I-95 off the mainline of the New Jersey Turnpike at exit 6 and connects to the Pennsylvania Turnpike via the Delaware River–Turnpike Toll Bridge, a continuous truss bridge spanning the Delaware River. This extension, and the Delaware River bridge, were opened to traffic on May 25, 1956. A , six-lane highway, it has an exit, designated as 6A, to US 130 near Florence. The extension was formerly designated as Route 700P, but was officially designated as I-95 after the Somerset Freeway was cancelled, and was signed as such when the first components of the Pennsylvania Turnpike/Interstate 95 Interchange Project were completed on September 22, 2018.

The third extension, the  stretch of I-95 north of US 46 came under NJTA jurisdiction in 1992, as NJDOT sold the road to balance the state budget, and it is not tolled. This section of the road – known as the I-95 Extension – extends the mainline to travel past the interchange for I-80 in Teaneck where the original terminus was, and through a cut in the Hudson Palisades to the GWB Plaza. Even though it was not constructed when the Turnpike first opened, the I-95 Extension is still considered to be a part of the mainline, not just a spur like the Newark Bay or Pennsylvania Turnpike extensions are, despite it being tolled. Past I-80 to Fort Lee, the Turnpike logo is only signed southbound in this segment, and rarely northbound since it terminates very soon in that direction. The turnpike terminates at US 9W (exit 72), with the final approaches to the George Washington Bridge along I-95 maintained by the Port Authority of New York and New Jersey. Signs saying “Turnpike Entrance” southbound past I-80 mean entering the tolled parts of the Turnpike. Exit numbers along this section follow the mile markers I-95 would have had had the Somerset Freeway been built.

Services

Service areas

The New Jersey Turnpike is noted for naming its service areas after notable deceased people who had a connection to New Jersey.

Turnpike service areas consist mostly of fast-food restaurants operated by Iris Buyer LLC (Applegreen). Each rest area also includes restrooms, water fountains, a Sunoco gas station with a small convenience store, with gas price signs posted about half a mile (0.8 km) before reaching the rest area, and a separate parking area for cars and trucks. Some have a dedicated bus parking area, Wi-Fi, and a gift shop as well.

Before 1982, there was a service area on the northbound side named for Admiral William Halsey. However, in 1982, exit 13A was created, which caused the obscuring of the rest area, as they both overlapped with each other. Anyone who wanted to get to the service area missed exiting at exit 13A, and (northbound) drivers who took that exit missed that service area. The service area closed permanently on June 4, 1994. Today, it can be seen by motorists when exiting 13A from the northbound car lanes, where a temporary concrete barrier obstructs an open asphalt lot.

Two service plazas were located on the Newark Bay Extension (one eastbound and one westbound) located west of exit 14B. These were closed in the early 1970s. The eastbound plaza was named for John Stevens, the westbound plaza for Peter Stuyvesant.

In late March 2010, it was revealed that the state Transportation Commissioner was considering selling the naming rights of the rest areas to help address a budget shortfall.

The Grover Cleveland Service Area in Woodbridge was temporarily closed because of storm damage from Hurricane Sandy in October 2012, with only fuel available. It was rebuilt and fully reopened on November 23, 2015. In 2015, the NJTA installed Tesla Supercharger stations in the Molly Pitcher and Joyce Kilmer service areas to allow Tesla car owners to charge their vehicles. A proposal to offer charging stations for non-Tesla vehicles is also under consideration.

Emergency assistance 
The NJTA offers  shoulders wherever possible, and disabled vehicle service may be obtained by dialing #95 on a cellular phone. Towing and roadside assistance are provided from authorized garages. The New Jersey State Police is the primary police agency that handles calls for service on the turnpike. Other emergency services such as fire and first aid are usually handled by the jurisdictions in which that section of the turnpike passes.

History

Precursors and planning 

Route 100 and Route 300 were two state highways proposed in the 1930s by the New Jersey State Highway Department as precursors to the New Jersey Turnpike.

The road that is now the New Jersey Turnpike was first planned by the State Highway Department as two untolled freeways in 1938. Route 100 was the route from New Brunswick to the George Washington Bridge, plus a spur to the Holland Tunnel, now the Newark Bay Extension of the Turnpike. Route 300 was the southern part of the turnpike from the Delaware Memorial Bridge to New Brunswick. However, the State Highway Department did not have the funds to complete the two freeways, and very little of the road was built under its auspices. Instead, in 1948, the NJTA was created to build the road, and the two freeways were built as a single toll road.

Route S100 was a proposed spur of Route 100 in Elizabeth. It was never built, although Route 81 follows a similar alignment.

According to a letter to the editor written by Kathleen Troast Pitney, the daughter of Paul L. Troast, the first chairman of the NJTA:

A brochure Interesting Facts about the New Jersey Turnpike, dating from soon after the road's opening, says that when the turnpike's bonds are paid off, "the law provides that the turnpike be turned over to the state for inclusion in the public highway system". Due to new construction, and the expectation that the turnpike pays for policing and maintenance, this has never come to pass.

Construction

The project of building the turnpike had its challenges. One major problem was the construction in the city of Elizabeth, where either 450 homes or 32 businesses would be destroyed, depending on the chosen route. The engineers decided to go through the residential area, since they considered it the grittiest and the closest route to both Newark Airport and the Port Newark-Elizabeth Marine Terminal seaport.

When construction finally got to Newark, there was the new challenge of deciding to build either over or under the Pulaski Skyway. If construction went above the skyway, the costs would be much higher. If they went under, the costs would be lower, but the roadway would be very close to the Passaic River, making it harder for ships to pass through. The turnpike was ultimately built to pass under. As part of a 2005 seismic retrofit project, the NJTA lowered its roadway to increase vertical clearance and allow for full-width shoulders, which had been constrained by the location of the skyway supports. The work was carried out under a $35 million contract in 2004 by Koch Skanska of Carteret. The project's engineers were from a joint venture of Dewberry Goodking Inc. and HNTB Corp. Temporary towers supported the bridge while bearings were removed from the 150 piers and the concrete replaced on the pier tops. The lowering process for an  section of the bridge was done over 56 increments, during five weeks of work.

While continuing up to the New Jersey Meadowlands, the crossings were harder because of the fertile marsh land of silt and mud. Near the shallow mud, the mud was filled with crushed stone, and the roadway was built above the water table. In the deeper mud, caissons were sunk down to a firm stratum and filled with sand, then both the caissons and the surrounding areas were covered with blankets of sand. Gradually, the water was brought up, and drained into adjacent meadows. Then, construction of the two major bridges over the Passaic and Hackensack Rivers was completed. The bridges were built to give motorists a clear view of the New York City skyline, but with high retaining walls to create the illusion of not being on a river crossing. The  Passaic River (Chaplain Washington) Bridge cost $13.7 million to build; the  Hackensack River Bridge cost $9.5 million.

After the turnpike was built in 1952, the NJTA and the New York State Thruway Authority (NYSTA) proposed a  extension of the New Jersey Turnpike that would run from its end (at US 46 in Ridgefield Park at the time) up to West Nyack, New York, at I-87, on the New York State Thruway. The section through New Jersey was to be constructed and maintained by the NJTA, while the section in New York was to be built and maintained by the NYSTA.

The purpose of this extension was to give motorists a "more direct bypass of the New York City area" to New England, by using the Tappan Zee Bridge. The extension was to parallel New York State Route 303 (NY 303) and the present-day CSX River Subdivision, and have limited interchanges. It was to have an interchange with the Palisades Interstate Parkway and at I-87 (New York State Thruway) in West Nyack. This project did not survive; by 1970, it became too expensive to buy right-of-way access, and community opposition was fierce. Therefore, the NJTA and the NYSTA cancelled the project. NJDOT did construct a small segment of this extension, the portion between US 46 and I-80, as part of the I-95 Extension. This segment was later transferred to the NJTA.

1950s to 1990s

With the turnpike completed, traffic began to increase, which prompted the NJTA's first widening project. In 1955, the authority proposed to widen the turnpike from four lanes to six lanes (three in each direction) between exit 4 in Mount Laurel Township and exit 10 in Woodbridge Township, and from four lanes to an eight-lane, dual-dual setup (2-2-2-2, two express carriageways and two local carriageways in each direction) between exit 10 and exit 14 in Newark.

In 1966, the Turnpike was widened between exit 10 and exit 14 under a new expansion plan. This abolished the express-local roadway plan and created the car and truck-buses lane configuration (3-3-3-3). This project also included closing the old exit 10 at Woodbridge and replacing it with a new exit 10 in Edison Township; exit 11 was also rebuilt to provide complete access to the Garden State Parkway. The dual-dual setup was widened south to exit 9 in East Brunswick Township in 1973, and again extended farther south in 1990 to exit 8A in Monroe Township. 

In 1971, the NJTA proposed building the Alfred E. Driscoll Expressway. As a proposed part of the turnpike system, its seven interchanges would have included toll plazas except at the northern end of the turnpike. By 1972, the proposed road met fierce opposition from Ocean, Monmouth, and Middlesex counties with quality of life being the main concern. The NJTA proceeded anyway and began selling bonds. But by December 1973, Governor-elect Brendan Byrne decided to stop the project altogether. Despite this, the authority continued with its plan. It was not until February 1977 that the authority abandoned its plan to build the road. The rights-of-way were sold in 1979, shelving the project indefinitely.

A series of roadway accidents occurred on the New Jersey Turnpike in the town of Kearny, on October 23 and 24, 1973. The first collision occurred at 11:20 p.m. EDT on the 23rd. Further accidents continued to occur until 2:45 a.m. the next day as cars plowed into the unseen accident ahead of them. Sixty-six vehicles were involved, and nine people died as a result. Thirty-nine suffered non-fatal injuries. The primary cause of the accident was related to a fire consisting of burning garbage, aggravated by foggy conditions. This produced an area of extremely poor visibility.

Exit 13A in Elizabeth was constructed in the late 1990s as part of the construction of the Jersey Gardens outlet mall. The exit, which opened in 1999, cost $140 million and was funded by the developers of Jersey Gardens.

2000s to present 

On September 30, 2000, NJTA began using E-ZPass for electronic toll collection. In January 2004, the authority opened the refurbished 18W toll gate in Carlstadt; the refurbishment included two E-ZPass express lanes in both directions. In July 2004, the New Jersey Turnpike Authority opened the new exit 1 toll gate in Carneys Point Township, with 23 lanes, including two E-ZPass express lanes in either direction.

In 2005, the authority opened exit 15X to allow access to the newly built Secaucus Junction train station. The authority lowered the Eastern Spur (between mileposts 107.3 and 107.5 in Newark) in 2005. The lowered spur now consists of a minimum  vertical clearance and a  horizontal clearance on the shoulders underneath the Pulaski Skyway (US 1/9).

In February 2006, the authority updated exit 8A in Monroe Township. The former exit ramp that allowed traffic onto Route 32 westbound, has been closed off. Instead, a new ramp leads to a traffic light at the intersection of the ramp and County Route 535 (CR 535) in South Brunswick Township. CR 535 was expanded between the new ramp intersection and Route 32. The authority planned to build Route 92, an east–west spur from US 1 and Ridge Road in the township of South Brunswick to the mainline of the turnpike at exit 8A in Monroe Township. This proposition was cancelled on December 1, 2006.

Throughout the first decade of the 21st century, the NJTA made repairs to several bridge decks, including the bridge crossing the Rancocas Creek, which was resurfaced in 2007. The NJTA reconfigured exit 12 in the Borough of Carteret to reduce truck traffic. A new grade separated interchange-ramp was constructed from Roosevelt Avenue east and connects to the toll gate. In addition, the seven-lane toll gate was demolished and replaced with a new 17-lane one. This project was completed in April 2010, five to six months behind schedule. The authority rebuilt exit 16W in the Borough of East Rutherford. Several new ramps were built, and old ones were destroyed. One major modification was destroying the old ramp from the tollgate to Route 3 west and having a new ramp swing around in the opposite direction and merge with Route 3 west, thereby completing the double trumpet-like interchange. This project was completed by March 2010.

The NJTA began accepting E-ZPass on all toll lanes at all turnpike interchanges on March 5, 2011. On April 28, 2011, attempts to privatize toll collection on the New Jersey Turnpike were thwarted as a deal between the New Jersey Turnpike Authority and two unions to reduce toll collector salaries was made instead. The Authority reconstructed the Route 495 westbound overpass across the turnpike at exit 16E in Secaucus. This was finished in the middle of 2011. Safety improvements were made at exit 2 in Woolwich Township, when the NJTA installed a traffic signal at the entrance to the turnpike with US 322, and the intersection was widened with turn lanes on all approaches. Construction was complete in late 2012. On March 31, 2014, the NJTA began a new lane control system on the eastbound lanes of the Newark Bay–Hudson County Extension, using the shoulder as a travel lane between exit 14 to 14C. This system was discontinued on May 20, 2019, as part of a bridge redecking project.

On March 24, 2020, the New Jersey Turnpike Authority temporarily suspended cash toll collection due to the COVID-19 pandemic. Drivers without E-ZPass transponders had their license plates photographed at the toll plazas and were sent bills in the mail. Cash collection resumed on May 19 of that year. The NJTA also announced in 2020 that it would build E-ZPass express lanes at exit 18E; the lanes opened in November 2021.

Widening between interchanges 6 and 9 

This was to be completed by 2014 when Pennsylvania was supposed to finish an interchange, that would connect its turnpike to the existing I-95 in Bristol Township, Pennsylvania. Finances were to be supplied by rerouting money from the planned Route 92 Turnpike extension.
As part of this project, the NJTA expanded the turnpike by changing the dual-dual configuration (from 2-3-3-2 to 3-3-3-3) between exit 9 in East Brunswick Township and exit 8A in Monroe Township. Minimal construction was needed since overpasses were already built with future expansion in mind. Only final preparation and paving of an outer lane in the outer roadways were required to accommodate the extra lane. New signage and lighting were installed as part of the widening project. It was thought that some transmission towers that ran near the turnpike would have to be reconfigured to make room for the newly constructed roadways. However, this idea was dismissed because it would have been cost prohibitive, and the towers, in fact, did not need to be relocated. The widened turnpike features six lanes in each direction (3-3-3-3), double the previous capacity. The following interchanges were upgraded with this widening project: exit 6 (Mansfield), exit 7 (Bordentown Township), exit 7A (Robbinsville), exit 8 (East Windsor), and exit 8A (Monroe).

On July 2, 2009, a ceremonial groundbreaking took place near exit 8 to initiate the widening of the turnpike. On January 28, 2014, the last two of the project's 31 construction contracts was awarded. On May 17–18, 2014, the NJTA switched traffic from the inner roadway for the new outer roadway to do repairs and resurfacing of the inner roadway. A total of six northbound lanes between exits 6 and 9 opened on October 26, 2014, while the southbound lanes opened a week later on November 3, 2014. The final cost reported to be $2.3 billion. The project employed 1,000 workers a day, and at one point was the largest active road construction project in the Western Hemisphere.

In late October 2015, the southbound inner roadway exit ramp at exit 7A was closed to make repairs to the overpass crossing over the truck lanes. Steel plates beneath the deck of the exit ramp overpass "were not built to specification" when it was originally constructed. The ramp was reopened in late November 2015.

On January 1, 2007, the NJTA released its plan for exit 8 in East Windsor Township. The old interchange, located west of the turnpike, was demolished and replaced with a new one located to the east of the turnpike. The new interchange configuration opened in January 2013, featuring a new toll plaza consisting of 10 lanes, with direct access to Route 133 (Hightstown Bypass) without going through any traffic lights, as well as to Route 33 by using a grade-separated interchange. Construction of a realigned Milford Road, near the interchange, was open to traffic in October 2011. Milford Road was converted into an overpass crossing over the new interchange 8 ramp. The junction with the realigned Milford Road, Route 33 and Monmouth Street was also modified.

Other construction 

Due to traffic congestion outside exit 8A, the NJTA plans to improve Route 32 from its intersection at US 130 in South Brunswick to the exit 8A tollgate in Monroe Township. Named the "Interchange 8A to Route 130 Connection", plans and dates have yet to be determined.

To reduce congestion, the NJTA has widened Route 18 and reconstructed all the associated ramps at exit 9 (except the ramp to Route 18 north) in East Brunswick Township. Construction began in late 2012 and was completed in mid-2016.

The authority is planning a  roadway and bridge, called the "Tremley Point Road Connector", from Industrial Highway in the Borough of Carteret to Tremley Point Road in the City of Linden. The purpose of this project is to increase truck access to the Tremley Point industrial area in Linden while moving trucks off local streets in residential neighborhoods. The authority chose this access road rather than a full interchange with Tremley Point Road from the turnpike mainline because of its proximity to both exits 12 and 13. The estimated completion date of the connector has yet to be determined, but as of October 2019, a construction contract has been awarded.

In conjunction with the Port Authority of New York and New Jersey's replacement of the Goethals Bridge, improvements are being studied at exit 13 in Elizabeth and Linden.

The authority plans to improve exit 14A in Jersey City and connecting roads in Bayonne because the current interchange is in "poor condition" and suffers from chronic congestion. This is part of a bigger project that addresses future congestion along Route 440. Official groundbreaking occurred on March 11, 2015, with an expanded toll plaza and connector bridge targeted for completion in late 2018 with a $310 million budget. The newly expanded exit 14A reopened in May 2018 ahead of its anticipated opening later in the year.

All of the turnpike's original variable-message signs (VMS) were replaced from 2010 to 2015, and many new signs were also added. The replacement signs, which feature full graphic color matrix technology, are more up-to-date and feature travel times to major routes when not otherwise in use.

The NJTA plans to add an additional lane in each direction between exits 1 and 4. Construction is planned to begin in 2025 and be completed in 2032.

Tolls

The New Jersey Turnpike is a closed-system toll road, using a system of long-distance tickets, obtained once by the motorist upon entering and surrendered upon exiting at toll gates. The toll fee depends on the distance traveled—longer distances result in higher tolls. , the automobile toll from exit 1 to exit 18 is $19.45 using cash and $19.42 using E-ZPass electronic toll collection. If the ticket is lost, the driver must pay the highest toll fee upon exiting. In September 2000, the turnpike introduced E-ZPass electronic toll collection. Discounts were available to all users of the E-ZPass system until 2002. The cost to implement the E-ZPass system forced the NJTA to eliminate the discounts during peak hours and instead impose a $1 per month E-ZPass fee to account holders. E-ZPass customers with NJ accounts still receive a discount during off-peak hours, when the automobile toll from exit 1 to exit 18 is $14.15. Cash customers do not receive this discount. Four toll plazas on the turnpike have Express E-ZPass lanes, allowing E-ZPass customers to travel through toll areas at highway speeds, thanks to the addition of E-ZPass sensors on an overhead gantry. These high-speed toll gates are located at the northern terminus of the road on both the Western Spur and the Eastern Spur, the southern terminus in Carneys Point, and on the Pennsylvania Turnpike Extension. At each location, traditional E-ZPass and cash lanes are also available. Every toll lane on the turnpike accepts E-ZPass.

The non-tolled I-295, which parallels the turnpike for much of its southern length, is often used as an alternate route for shunpiking by locals and through travelers alike; before the expansion of the exit 1 toll plaza, this route was promoted through signage and radio announcements from the New Jersey State Police as a bypass of summer congestion at the plaza.

On March 24, 2020, the NJTA temporarily suspended cash toll collection because of the COVID-19 pandemic. Drivers without E-ZPass transponders had their license plates photographed at the toll plazas and were sent bills in the mail. Cash collection resumed on May 19 of that year.

The Turnpike and the Garden State Parkway raised tolls in 2020 and 2021 and, in its 2023 budget, called for another toll increase of 7.4% in 2023. The NJTA said the increase was due to “…pressures on discretionary travel and costs due to an inflation rate of 8.3%....”

Exit list

Mainline and Eastern Spur

Pearl Harbor Memorial Turnpike Extension

Newark Bay Extension

Western Spur

I-95 Extension

In popular culture

21st century
Somerdale-based Flying Fish Brewing currently makes the "Exit Series" of beers, which are named in honor of various New Jersey Turnpike exits, with each beer intended to be reflective of the communities in or near where the relevant exit is located.
In 2015, lyrics on Passenger's song "Riding to New York" on the Whispers album describe a man riding a bike from Minnesota to New York City: "And fly through Pennsylvania and the Jersey Turnpike tolls."
From 2009 to 2012, "Jersey Turnpike" was the name of a dance move created by Deena Nicole Cortese of Jersey Shore, which aired on MTV.
From 1999 to 2007, the opening credits of every episode of The Sopranos, which aired on HBO, features shots of the New Jersey Turnpike, including Exits 12, 13, 14-14C, and 15W.
In 2001, the video game Need for Speed: The Run, a racing event starts on the Newark Bay Extension at Exit 14B before entering Jersey City and Liberty State Park and ending in the Holland Tunnel as the driver, who is the player of the game, is chased by police while driving into New York City.
In 2001, the song "Where I Come From" by country singer Alan Jackson begins with the lyrics: "Well I was rollin' wheels and shiftin' gears 'round that Jersey Turnpike."

20th century
In 1999, on The West Wing episode "The State Dinner", character Leo McGarry responds to a truckers union representative who uses inappropriate language: "This is the White House. It's not the Jersey Turnpike."
In 1999, in the film Being John Malkovich, characters are transported into John Malkovich's mind and then are suddenly dropped in a ditch beside the New Jersey Turnpike.
In 1988, one of the promotional taglines in the film Moving is: "On the New Jersey Turnpike, no one can hear you scream."
In 1986, The Dead Milkmen's album Eat Your Paisley! includes the song "Vince Lombardi Service Center", the name of a New Jersey Turnpike service center in Ridgefield, New Jersey, as a CD bonus track.
In 1982, the Bruce Springsteen song, "State Trooper" on the Nebraska album, mentions the New Jersey Turnpike in its opening lyric: "New Jersey Turnpike, riding on a wet night. 'Neath the refinery's glow, out where the great black rivers flow."
In 1981, the character "Paulie Herman" on Saturday Night Live, played by Joe Piscopo, was known for an ongoing show segment in which he says: "Are you from Jersey? I'm from Jersey. What exit?", referring to New Jersey Turnpike and Garden State Parkway exits.
In 1975, the Bruce Springsteen song "Jungleland" on the Born to Run album mentions the New Jersey Turnpike in its lyrics: "Man, there's an opera out on the Turnpike. There's a ballet being fought out in the alley. Until the local cops, cherry tops, rips this holy night."
In 1972, Simon & Garfunkel's song "America" includes the lyric: "Counting the cars on the New Jersey Turnpike".
In 1966, the autobiographical Mamas & Papas song "Creeque Alley" includes the lines: "Standing on the turnpike, thumb out to hitchhike/Take her to New York right away", referring to a broke Mama Cass Elliot hitching a ride from Maryland back to New York City via the New Jersey Turnpike.
In 1956, Chuck Berry's song "You Can't Catch Me" includes the lyrics: "New Jersey Turnpike in the/wee wee hours I was/rolling slowly 'cause of/drizzlin' showers."

See also

Notes

References

Further reading

External links 

 New Jersey Turnpike Authority (& Garden State Parkway) official website
 NJTP's official website for the Interchange 6 to 9 Widening Program 
 nycroads.com; New Jersey Turnpike Historic Overview
 An expanded view of road jurisdiction near the confluence of US 46, I-95 / NJ Turnpike, I-280, NJ 7 and CR 508 in Kearny
 New Jersey Turnpike (I-95) (Greater New York Roads)
 New Jersey Turnpike (NJ 700) (Greater New York Roads)
 The New Jersey Turnpike Charles M. Noble The Chief Engineer New Jersey Turnpike Authority Trenton, N. J.

 
Newark Bay Extension
Interstate 95
Limited-access roads in New Jersey
State highways in New Jersey
Toll roads in New Jersey
Tolled sections of Interstate Highways
Transportation in Bergen County, New Jersey
Transportation in Burlington County, New Jersey
Transportation in Camden County, New Jersey
Transportation in Essex County, New Jersey
Transportation in Gloucester County, New Jersey
Transportation in Hudson County, New Jersey
Transportation in Mercer County, New Jersey
Transportation in Middlesex County, New Jersey
Transportation in the Pine Barrens (New Jersey)
Transportation in Salem County, New Jersey
Transportation in Union County, New Jersey
Articles containing video clips